Amron is a surname and male given name. Notable people with the name include:

 Alan Amron (born 1948), American inventor
 Amrom Harry Katz (1915–1997), American physicist
 Scott Amron (born 1980), American conceptual artist and electrical engineer

Masculine given names